The Women's giant slalom competition at the FIS Alpine World Ski Championships 2021 was held on 18 February 2021.

Results
The first run was started at 10:00 and the second run at 13:30.

References

Women's giant slalom